Kotla is a Polish and Indian name. Notable people with the surname include:

 Pavel Kotla (born 1972), Polish conductor
 Ryszard Kotla (born 1947), Polish writer and teacher
 Zdzislaw Kotla (1949–2012), Polish Olympic yachtsman
 Kotla Vijaya Bhaskara Reddy (1920–2001), Indian politician 

Polish-language surnames